The small cackling goose (Branta hutchinsii minima), also known as the Ridgway's goose, is the smallest subspecies of cackling goose and the smallest variant of white-cheeked goose.

Description
Ridgway’s geese are the smallest of the white cheeked geese and the second smallest goose in the genus Branta, following the red-breasted goose. It is only slightly larger than a mallard and has a culmen (bill) length of 32 mm.

The small cackling goose’s calls are described as high pitched yelps. In flight, it can be identified by its fast wingbeat, in contrast to Canada geese and the larger subspecies of cackling geese.

Distribution
Small cackling geese are known to summer in western Alaska, and winter in the Willamette Valley. It has also been known to occur in California and southern Washington.

References

 http://www.dfw.state.or.us/resources/hunting/waterfowl/goose-permits/docs/Goosefieldguide_2ndEdition_final.pdf
http://eol.org/pages/1274552/overview
http://www.utahbirds.org/RecCom/IDhelp/Cackling_Goose-NAB.pdf

Branta
Taxa named by Robert Ridgway